Schoenhals or Schönhals is a surname. Notable people with the surname include:

 Albrecht Schoenhals (1888–1978), German film actor
 Karl von Schönhals (1788–1857), Austrian general
 Michael Schoenhals (born 1953), Swedish sinologist
 Paul Schoenhals (born 1941), Canadian politician